

Flowering plants

Superasterids

Ichthyosaurs

New taxa

Archosaurs

Newly named basal archosauromorphs

Synapsids

Non-mammalian

References